Serge Semenenko (1903 – April 24, 1980) was a Ukrainian-born Hollywood banker in the 1950s and 1960s, representing the First National Bank of Boston.

He came to Istanbul from  Odesa at the age of 18, studied at Robert College and graduated with a GPA of 8.5 out of 10. He then moved to the United States to continue his studies at Harvard Business School.

In 1956 he was part of a group of investors who bought out the shares in Warner Bros. Pictures that were sold by Harry Warner and Albert Warner.

The Warners bought the Brunswick label in 1930, but the collapse of the record market during the Great Depression cost the studio heavily and the label was sold to the American Record Company at the end of 1931 for a fraction of its former value. As a result, Warner Bros. had shied away from any involvement in the record business for the next 25 years.

According to music historian Fred Goodman, Semenenko had a strong interest in the entertainment business. After joining the Warner Bros. board he pushed studio boss Jack L. Warner to establish a recorded music division, which was eventually incorporated in 1958 as Warner Bros. Records.

Semenko put together a syndicate of six banks in 1963 to help a troubled Curtis Publishing.

In 1967, he resigned as vice-chairman and a director of First Boston after his activities were dissected in a first article in The Wall Street Journal.

Notes

1903 births
1980 deaths
American bankers
American investors
Businesspeople from Odesa
20th-century American businesspeople
Emigrants from the Russian Empire to the United States
Robert College alumni
Harvard Business School alumni